Hümaşah Sultan (1628 – after 1676) was the Eighth Haseki and only legal wife of Sultan Ibrahim of the Ottoman Empire.

Marriage
Hümaşah married Ibrahim in 1647, and was given the title of "Eighth Haseki". After her marriage she became known as "Telli Haseki" because of the silver and gold threads (tels) that are traditionally used to adorn a bride's hair. Her marriage was described by the historian Mustafa Naima:

After marrying her, Ibrahim gave her the treasury of Egypt as dowry and ordered the palace of Ibrahim Pasha to be carpeted in sable furs and given to her.

Ibrahim subjected his sisters, Kösem's daughters Ayşe, Fatma and Hanzade, and his niece Kaya to the indignity of subordination of his concubines. He took away their lands and jewels, and made them serve Hümaşah, by standing at attention like servants while she ate and by fetching and holding the soap, basin and the pitcher of water with which she washed her hands. Because of what he believed was failure to serve her properly, the Sultan then banished them to Edirne Palace.

She was described as intelligent and smart, but also sweet and caring.

Hümaşah while pregnant, settled in the Old Palace, after Ibrahim's deposition and death in August 1648. Two months later, in October 1648, she gave birth to a son named Şehzade Orhan, who died at the age of one in January 1650.

Death
The records of the Old Palace record the presence of Hümaşah for the last time in 1672.  

It was initially believed that she died in that year, but the discovery of the report, dated 1676, by the Venetian ambassador Giacomo Querini, proves instead that Hümaşah, except for the normal harem protocol for the consort of deceased sultans, especially if they were mothers of children, she had remarried, with the Kaymakam (vice governor) of Constantinople, Ibrahim Paşah. The 1672 was therefore probably the year in which the wedding was held and she left the Palace. 
 "... Ibrahim Pasha, Caimacan [governor] of Constantinople for the fifth time, a man of considerable presence, of sweet genius and placid costume. He holds in marriage the Telì Sultana, the King’s stepmother...", '' Giacomo Querini, Venetian ambassador, 1676  
It is therefore not known when she died or where she was buried.

In popular culture
In the Turkish series, Muhteşem Yüzyıl: Kösem, Hümaşah is portrayed by actress Müge Boz.

See also

Ottoman Empire
Ottoman family tree
Ottoman dynasty
Ottoman Emperors family tree (simplified)
List of consorts of the Ottoman Sultans

References

Sources

 

17th-century consorts of Ottoman sultans
1630s births
1670s deaths
Georgians from the Ottoman Empire